Mitromorpha apollinis is a species of sea snail, a marine gastropod mollusk in the family Mitromorphidae.

Description

Distribution
This marine species occurs off the Agulhas Bank, South Africa

References

  Thiele J., 1925. Gastropoden der Deutschen Tiefsee-Expedition. In:. Wissenschaftliche Ergebnisse der Deutschen Tiefsee-Expedition auf dem Dampfer “Valdivia” 1898–1899  II. Teil, vol. 17, No. 2, Gustav Fischer, Berlin

External links
 

Endemic fauna of South Africa
apollinis
Gastropods described in 1925